This Pulitzer Prize has been awarded since 1942 for a distinguished example of reporting on national affairs in the United States.  In its first six years (1942–1947), it was called the Pulitzer Prize for Telegraphic Reporting – National.

List of winners for Pulitzer Prize for Telegraphic Reporting – National
1942: Louis Stark of The New York Times for his distinguished reporting of important labor stories during the year.
1943: No award given
1944: Dewey L. Fleming of The Baltimore Sun For his distinguished reporting during the year 1943.
1945: James Reston of The New York Times for his news dispatches and interpretive articles on the Dumbarton Oaks security conference.
1946: Edward A. Harris of St. Louis Post-Dispatch for his articles on the Tidewater Oil situation which contributed to the nationwide opposition to the appointment and confirmation of Edwin W. Pauley as Undersecretary of the Navy.
1947: Edward T. Folliard of The Washington Post for his series of articles published during 1946 on the Columbians, Inc.

List of winners for Pulitzer Prize for National Reporting
1948: Bert Andrews, New York Herald Tribune, "for his articles on 'A State Department Security Case' published in I947."
1948: Nat S. Finney, Minneapolis Tribune, "for his stories on the plan of the Truman administration to impose secrecy about the ordinary affairs of federal civilian agencies in peacetime."
1949: C. P. Trussell, New York Times, "for consistent excellence covering the national scene from Washington."
1950: Edwin O. Guthman, The Seattle Times, "for his series on the clearing of Communist charges of Professor Melvin Rader, who had been accused of attending a secret Communist school."
1951: no award made
1952: Anthony Leviero, New York Times, "for his exclusive article of April 21, 1951, disclosing the record of conversations between President Truman and General of the Army Douglas MacArthur at Wake Island in their conference of October 1950."
1953: Don Whitehead, Associated Press, "for his article called 'The Great Deception', dealing with the intricate arrangements by which the safety of President-elect Eisenhower was guarded en route from Morningside Heights in New York to Korea."
1954: Richard Wilson, the Des Moines Register, "for his exclusive publication of the FBI Report to the White House in the Harry Dexter White case before it was laid before the Senate by J. Edgar Hoover."
1955: Anthony Lewis of Washington Daily News, "for publishing a series of articles which were adjudged directly responsible for clearing Abraham Chasanow, an employee of the U.S. Navy Department, and bringing about his restoration to duty with an acknowledgment by the Navy Department that it had committed a grave injustice in dismissing him as a security risk. Mr. Lewis received the full support of his newspaper in championing an American citizen, without adequate funds or resources for his defense, against an unjust act by a government department."
1956: Charles L. Bartlett, Chattanooga Times, for his original disclosures that led to the resignation of Harold E. Talbott as Secretary of the Air Force.
1957: James Reston, The New York Times, "for his distinguished national correspondence, including both news dispatches and interpretive reporting, an outstanding example of which was his five-part analysis of the effect of President Eisenhower's illness on the functioning of the Executive Branch of the Federal Government."
1958: Clark Mollenhoff, Des Moines Register and Tribune, "for his persistent inquiry into labor racketeering, which included investigatory reporting of wide significance."
1958: Relman Morin, Associated Press, "for his dramatic and incisive eyewitness report of mob violence on September 23, 1957, during the integration crisis at the Central High School in Little Rock, Arkansas."
1959: Howard Van Smith, Miami News, "for a series of articles that focused public notice on deplorable conditions in a Florida migrant labor camp, resulted in the provision of generous assistance for the 4,000 stranded workers in the camp, and thereby called attention to the national problem presented by 1,500,000 migratory laborers."
1960: Vance Trimble, Scripps-Howard Newspaper Alliance, "for a series of articles exposing the extent of nepotism in the Congress of the United States."
1961: Edward R. Cony, Wall Street Journal, "for his analysis of a timber transaction which drew the attention of the public to the problems of business ethics."
1962: Nathan G. Caldwell and Gene S. Graham, Nashville Tennessean, "for their exclusive disclosure and six years of detailed reporting, under great difficulties, of the undercover cooperation between management interests in the coal industry and the United Mine Workers."
1963: Anthony Lewis, New York Times, "for his distinguished reporting of the proceedings of the United States Supreme Court during the year, with particular emphasis on the coverage of the decision in the reapportionment case and its consequences in many of the States of the Union."
1964: Merriman Smith, United Press International, "for his outstanding coverage of the assassination of President John F. Kennedy."
1965: Louis M. Kohlmeier Jr., Wall Street Journal, "for his enterprise in reporting the growth of the fortune of President Lyndon B. Johnson and his family."
1966: Haynes Johnson, Washington Evening Star, "for his distinguished coverage of the civil rights conflict centered about Selma, Ala., and particularly his reporting of its aftermath."
1967: Stanley Penn and Monroe Karmin, The Wall Street Journal, "for their investigative reporting of the connection between American crime and gambling in the Bahamas."
1968: Nathan K. (Nick) Kotz, Des Moines Register and Tribune, "for his reporting of unsanitary conditions in many meat packing plants, which helped insure the passage of the Federal Wholesome Meat Act of 1967."
1968: Howard James, Christian Science Monitor, "for his series of articles, 'Crisis in the Courts.'"
1969: Robert Cahn, Christian Science Monitor, "for his inquiry into the future of our national parks and the methods that may help to preserve them."
1970: William J. Eaton, Chicago Daily News, "for disclosures about the background of Judge Clement F. Haynesworth Jr., in connection with his nomination for the United States Supreme Court."
1971: Lucinda Franks and Thomas Powers, United Press International, "for their documentary on the life and death of 28-year-old revolutionary Diana Oughton: 'The Making of a Terrorist.'"
1972: Jack Anderson, syndicated columnist, "for his reporting of American policy decision-making during the Indo-Pakistan War of 1971."
1973: Robert Boyd and Clark Hoyt, Knight Newspapers, "for their disclosure of Senator Thomas Eagleton's history of psychiatric therapy, resulting in his withdrawal as the Democratic Vice Presidential nominee in 1972."
1974: Jack White, Providence Journal and Evening Bulletin, "for his initiative in exclusively disclosing President Nixon's Federal income tax payments in 1970 and 1971."
1974: James R. Polk, Washington Star-News," for his disclosure of alleged irregularities in the financing of the campaign to re-elect President Nixon in 1972."
1975: Donald L. Barlett and James B. Steele, The Philadelphia Inquirer, "for their series 'Auditing the Internal Revenue Service,' which exposed the unequal application of Federal tax laws."
1976: James V. Risser, Des Moines Register, "for disclosing large-scale corruption in the American grain exporting trade."
1977: Walter Mears, Associated Press, "for his coverage of the 1976 Presidential campaign."
1978: Gaylord D. Shaw, Los Angeles Times, "for a series on unsafe structural conditions at the nation's major dams."
1979: James V. Risser, Des Moines Register, "for a series on farming damage to the environment."
1980: Bette Swenson Orsini and Charles Stafford, St. Petersburg Times, "for their investigation of the Church of Scientology."
1981: John M. Crewdson, The New York Times, "for his coverage of illegal aliens and immigration."
1982: Rick Atkinson, The Kansas City Times, "for the uniform excellence of his reporting and writing on stories of national import."
1983: Boston Globe, "for its balanced and informative special report on the nuclear arms race."
1984: John Noble Wilford, The New York Times, "for reporting on a wide variety of scientific topics of national import."
1985: Thomas J. Knudson, Des Moines Register, "for his series of articles that examined the dangers of farming as an occupation."
1986: Craig Flournoy and George Rodrigue of The Dallas Morning News, "or their investigation into subsidized housing in East Texas, which uncovered patterns of racial discrimination and segregation in public housing across the United States and led to significant reforms."
1986: Arthur Howe, The Philadelphia Inquirer, "for his enterprising and indefatigable reporting on massive deficiencies in Internal Revenue Service (IRS) processing of tax returns-reporting that eventually inspired major changes in IRS procedures and prompted the agency to make a public apology to U.S. taxpayers."
1987: Staff of The Miami Herald, "for its exclusive reporting and persistent coverage of the U.S.-Iran-Contra connection."
1987: Staff of The New York Times, "for coverage of the aftermath of the Challenger explosion, which included stories that identified serious flaws in the shuttle's design and in the administration of America's space program."
1988: Tim Weiner, The Philadelphia Inquirer, "for his series of reports on a secret Pentagon budget used by the government to sponsor defense research and an arms buildup."
1989: Donald L. Barlett and James B. Steele, The Philadelphia Inquirer, "for their 15-month investigation of "rifle shot" provisions in the Tax Reform Act of 1986, a series that aroused such widespread public indignation that Congress subsequently rejected proposals giving special tax breaks to many politically connected individuals and businesses."
1990: Ross Anderson, Bill Dietrich, Mary Ann Gwinn and Eric Nalder, The Seattle Times, "for coverage of the Exxon Valdez oil spill and its aftermath."
1991: Marjie Lundstrom and Rochelle Sharpe, Gannett News Service, "for reporting that disclosed hundreds of child abuse-related deaths go undetected each year as a result of errors by medical examiners."
1992: Jeff Taylor and Mike McGraw, The Kansas City Star, "for their critical examination of the U.S. Department of Agriculture."
1993: David Maraniss, The Washington Post, "for his revealing articles on the life and political record of candidate Bill Clinton."
1994: Eileen Welsome, Albuquerque Tribune, "for stories that related the experiences of American civilians who had been used unknowingly in government plutonium experiments nearly 50 years ago."
1995: Tony Horwitz, The Wall Street Journal, "for stories about working conditions in low-wage America."
1996: Alix M. Freedman of The Wall Street Journal, "for her coverage of the tobacco industry, including a report that exposed how ammonia additives heighten nicotine potency."
1997: Staff of The Wall Street Journal, "for its coverage of the struggle against AIDS in all of its aspects, the human, the scientific and the business, in light of promising treatments for the disease."
1998: Russell Carollo and Jeff Nesmith, Dayton Daily News, "for their reporting that disclosed dangerous flaws and mismanagement in the military health care system and prompted reforms."
1999: Staff of The New York Times, and notably Jeff Gerth, "for a series of articles that disclosed the corporate sale of American technology to China, with U.S. government approval despite national security risks, prompting investigations and significant changes in policy."
2000: Staff of The Wall Street Journal, "for its revealing stories that question U.S. defense spending and military deployment in the post–Cold War era and offer alternatives for the future."
2001: The New York Times staff, "for its compelling and memorable series exploring racial experiences and attitudes across contemporary America."
2002: The Washington Post staff, "for its comprehensive coverage of America's War on Terrorism, which regularly brought forth new information together with skilled analysis of unfolding developments."
2003: Alan Miller and Kevin Sack, Los Angeles Times, "for their revelatory and moving examination of a military aircraft, nicknamed 'The Widow Maker,' that was linked to the deaths of 45 pilots." (This was also nominated in the Investigative Reporting category.)
2004: Staff of Los Angeles Times, Nancy Cleeland, Evelyn Iritani, Abigail Goldman, Tyler Marshall, Rick Wartzman and John Corrigan, "for its engrossing examination of the tactics that have made Wal-Mart the largest company in the world with cascading effects across American towns and developing countries."
2005: Walt Bogdanich of New York Times, "for his heavily documented stories about the corporate cover-up of responsibility for fatal accidents at railway crossings."
2006: James Risen and Eric Lichtblau of the New York Times, "for their carefully sourced stories on secret domestic eavesdropping that stirred a national debate on the boundary line between fighting terrorism and protecting civil liberty."
2006: Staffs of The San Diego Union-Tribune and Copley News Service, "with notable work by Marcus Stern and Jerry Kammer, for their disclosure of bribe-taking that sent former Rep. Randy Cunningham to prison in disgrace."
2007: Charlie Savage of The Boston Globe, "for his revelations that President George W. Bush often used "signing statements" to assert his controversial right to bypass provisions of new laws."
2008: Jo Becker and Barton Gellman of The Washington Post, "for their lucid exploration of Vice President Dick Cheney and his powerful yet sometimes disguised influence on national policy."
2009: St. Petersburg Times Staff, "for “PolitiFact,” its fact-checking initiative during the 2008 presidential campaign that used probing reporters and the power of the World Wide Web to examine more than 750 political claims, separating rhetoric from truth to enlighten voters."
2010: Matt Richtel and members of The New York Times staff, "for incisive work, in print and online, on the hazardous use of cell phones, computers and other devices while operating cars and trucks, stimulating widespread efforts to curb distracted driving."
2011: Jesse Eisinger and Jake Bernstein of ProPublica, "for their exposure of questionable practices on Wall Street that contributed to the nation's economic meltdown, using digital tools to help explain the complex subject to lay readers."
2012: David Wood of The Huffington Post, "for his riveting exploration of the physical and emotional challenges facing American soldiers severely wounded in Iraq and Afghanistan during a decade of war".
2013: Lisa Song, Elizabeth McGowan and David Hasemyer of InsideClimate News, "for their rigorous reports on flawed regulation of the nation’s oil pipelines, focusing on potential ecological dangers posed by diluted bitumen (or "dilbit"), a controversial form of oil."
2014: David Philipps of The Gazette, Colorado Springs, "for expanding the examination of how wounded combat veterans are mistreated, focusing on loss of benefits for life after discharge by the Army for minor offenses, stories augmented with digital tools and stirring congressional action."
2015: Carol D. Leonnig of The Washington Post, "for her smart, persistent coverage of the Secret Service, its security lapses and the ways in which the agency neglected its vital task: the protection of the President of the United States."
2016: The Washington Post staff, "for its revelatory initiative in creating and using a national database to illustrate how often and why the police shoot to kill and who the victims are most likely to be." Kimbriell Kelly and Wesley Lowery were lead authors on the "Fatal Force" project.
2017: David Fahrenthold of The Washington Post, "for persistent reporting that created a model for transparent journalism in political campaign coverage while casting doubt on Donald Trump’s assertions of generosity toward charities."
2018: Staffs of The New York Times and The Washington Post, "for deeply sourced, relentlessly reported coverage in the public interest that dramatically furthered the nation’s understanding of Russian interference in the 2016 presidential election and its connections to the Trump campaign, the President-elect’s transition team and his eventual administration."
2019: Staff of The Wall Street Journal, "for uncovering President Trump’s secret payoffs to two women during his campaign who claimed to have had affairs with him, and the web of supporters who facilitated the transactions, triggering criminal inquiries and calls for impeachment."
2020: 
Dominic Gates, Steve Miletich, Mike Baker and Lewis Kamb of The Seattle Times "for groundbreaking stories that exposed design flaws in the Boeing 737 MAX that led to two deadly crashes and revealed failures in government oversight."
 T. Christian Miller, Megan Rose and Robert Faurtechi of ProPublica "for their investigation into America's 7th Fleet after a series of deadly naval accidents in the Pacific."
2022: Staff of The New York Times, "For an ambitious project that quantified a disturbing pattern of fatal traffic stops by police, illustrating how hundreds of deaths could have been avoided and how officers typically avoided punishment."

References

External links
Winners and Finalists of the Pulitzer Prize for National Reporting 
Winners and Finalists of the Pulitzer Prize for Telegraphic Reporting - National

National Reporting